Butler County Courthouse may refer to:

Butler County Courthouse (Alabama), Greenville, Alabama
 Butler County Courthouse (Iowa), Allison, Iowa
 Butler County Courthouse (Kansas), El Dorado, Kansas
 Butler County Courthouse (Missouri), Poplar Bluff, Misosuri
 Butler County Courthouse (Ohio), Hamilton, Ohio
 Butler County Courthouse (Pennsylvania), Butler, Pennsylvania